George Jones is a journalist who is the former political editor of The Telegraph and a member of the Leveson Inquiry.

Family
Jones' father was Clem Jones, who was editor of the Express & Star in Wolverhampton for a decade from 1960, and his brother is Nicholas Jones, the former political and industrial correspondent of BBC News.

References

Living people
Year of birth missing (living people)
The Daily Telegraph people